Mounir Benkassou (born 15 April 1976) is a Moroccan footballer. He usually plays as midfielder.

References

1976 births
Living people
Moroccan footballers
Footballers from Rabat
COD Meknès players
Kawkab Marrakech players
AS FAR (football) players
Association football midfielders